The following is a list of the casualties count in battles or offensives in world history. The list includes both sieges (not technically battles but usually yielding similar combat-related or civilian deaths) and civilian casualties during the battles. Large battle casualty counts are usually impossible to calculate precisely, but few in this list may include somewhat precise numbers. Many of these figures, though, are estimates, and, where possible, a range of estimates is presented. Figures display numbers of all types of casualties when available (killed, wounded, missing, and sick) but may only include number killed due to a lack of total data on the event. Where possible, the list specifies whether or not prisoners are included in the count. This list does not include bombing campaigns/runs (such as the attack on Pearl Harbor and the bombing of Tokyo) or massacres such as the Rape of Nanjing, which, despite potentially massive casualties, are not typically classified as "battles", since they are usually one-sided engagements or the nation attacked is not officially at war with the attackers. Tactical or strategic strikes, however, may form part of larger engagements which are themselves battles, small campaigns or offensives.

For wars and events more extensive in scope, such as major offensives or campaigns, see List of wars and anthropogenic disasters by death toll. For natural disasters, see List of natural disasters by death toll.

Sieges and urban combat
This list includes sieges, as well as modern battles fought primarily in urban areas. Major military operations that included city fighting are listed below. It is sorted by year.

Major operations
This list includes major operations and prolonged battles or operations fought over a large area or for a long time. The durations of some operations, like the Battle of Moscow, are disputed; so numbers found in various sources may differ for that reason alone.

Classical formation battles
These refer to battles in which armies met on a single field of battle and fought each other for anywhere from one to several days. This type of battle died out in favor of grander military operations.

Raids 
These include military actions done not in the purpose of capturing and holding a location.

Naval battles

See also

Notes

References
 

 
 
 
 

《White blood-red》 Zhang Zhenglong PLA Publishing House in August 1989 /
Liaoning-Shenyang Campaign

 

Casualties
Battles